Traffolyte, sometimes spelled Traffolite, was a brand name for multi-layered phenolic plastic sheets suitable for engraving. Each layer was a different colour so engraved letters or shapes would be a different colour from the unengraved portions. Thus it could be used for name tags, labels and signs.

History
The material dates back to 1927, when it was first produced by Metropolitan-Vickers Electrical Ltd. at their Trafford Park factory in Manchester, UK for transformer labels. The complete business was sold to De La Rue Insulation Ltd in 1945; De La Rue exited this business in the early 1960s. There are a large number of companies manufacturing bi- and tri-layer phenolic engraving stock and it has become a generic term; no record of its having been a registered trademark in the United States or UK has been found.

Hazards
Traffolyte signs and labels are cheap to produce, and were very popular in the past. However, phenolic dust is now recognized as a health hazard and so precautions must be taken during label production.

References

External links 
 Metropolitan-Vickers Electrical Co. Ltd. 1899 - 1949 by John Dummelow M.A., A.M.I.E.E 

 Metropolitan Vickers Electrical Ltd advertisement from 1939
 What is Traffolyte and How is it Made?

Phenol formaldehyde resins
Engraving
Metropolitan-Vickers
Plastic brands